Allan Cunningham Anderson (August 1896 –1986 ) was a Canadian newspaperman and diplomat. In 1959, he was appointed Ambassador Extraordinary and Plenipotentiary to Cuba and Haiti.

References

External links 
 Foreign Affairs and International Trade Canada Complete List of Posts

Ambassadors of Canada to Cuba
Ambassadors of Canada to Haiti
1896 births
Year of death missing